Antonio Gómez del Moral (15 November 1939 – 14 July 2021) was a Spanish professional road racing cyclist.

Major results

1960
 1st Stage 5 Vuelta a España
 1st Stages 1a & 2 Volta a Catalunya
 1st Stages 3a & 4 Vuelta a Levante
 3rd Overall Volta a Portugal
1st Stage 12
1961
 1st Stage 1b Vuelta a Levante
 2nd Overall Vuelta a Andalucía
1st Stage 2
 2nd Gran Premio Navarra
 2nd Trofeo Jaumendreu
 5th Overall Vuelta a España
1962
 1st  Overall Tour de l'Avenir
1st Stage 10
 1st Stage 9 Vuelta a España
 9th Overall Critérium du Dauphiné Libéré
1963
 1st Stage 8 Vuelta a España
 9th Overall Critérium du Dauphiné Libéré
1964
 1st  Overall Vuelta a Levante
 1st Stage 5 Volta a Portugal
 1st Stage 7b Volta a Catalunya
 2nd Trofeo Masferrer
 6th Overall Tour de Suisse
1965
 1st  Road race, National Road Championships
 1st  Overall Volta a Catalunya
1st Stage 6b
 1st Circuito de Getxo
 3rd Subida al Naranco
 9th Overall Vuelta a España
1966
 1st  Overall Vuelta a La Rioja
1st Stage 3
 1st Stage 9 Vuelta a España
 1st Klasika Primavera
 1st Circuito de Getxo
 1st Trofeo Jaumendreu
 1st Prueba Villafranca de Ordizia
 3rd Overall Setmana Catalana de Ciclisme
 7th Overall Vuelta a España
1967
 1st  National Hill Climb Championships (Gran Premio Navarra)
 1st Klasika Primavera
 1st Stage 2 Giro d'Italia
 2nd Overall Volta a Catalunya
1st Stage 4
 2nd GP Llodio
 2nd GP Vizcaya
1968
 2nd Road race, National Road Championships
 7th Overall Vuelta a España
1969
 1st  Overall Vuelta a Andalucía
1st Stage 6
 1st Stage 2b Vuelta a los Valles Mineros
 2nd Trofeo Masferrer
 2nd Klasika Primavera
1970
 1st Gran Premio Navarra
 2nd GP Llodio
 2nd GP Pascuas
1971
 2nd Overall Vuelta a Asturias
1st Prologue
 3rd Overall Vuelta a Aragón

References

External links

1939 births
2021 deaths
Spanish male cyclists
Spanish Giro d'Italia stage winners
Spanish Vuelta a España stage winners
Sportspeople from the Province of Córdoba (Spain)
Cyclists from Andalusia